Yagya Datt Sharma (1936 – 20 May 2016) was an Indian politician from the state of Madhya Pradesh of India. He represented Indore-4 constituency to the Madhya Pradesh Legislative Assembly for the first time as an independent candidate in 1967, Indore-2 in 1977 from Indian National Congress. He again represented Indore-4 in 1980.

In the early 1980s he became Speaker of the State lower house, but had to quit from his speaker-ship on the proved charges of illegal land acquisition in his constituency. He resigned on 19 July 1983; Arjun Singh was Chief Minister then.

References

External links

1936 births
2016 deaths
Speakers of the Madhya Pradesh Legislative Assembly
Politicians from Indore
Madhya Pradesh MLAs 1967–1972
Madhya Pradesh MLAs 1977–1980
Madhya Pradesh MLAs 1980–1985
Indian National Congress politicians from Madhya Pradesh